Lipid IVA 3-deoxy-D-manno-octulosonic acid transferase (KDO transferase, waaA (gene), kdtA (gene), 3-deoxy-D-manno-oct-2-ulosonic acid transferase, 3-deoxy-manno-octulosonic acid transferase, lipid IVA KDO transferase) is an enzyme with systematic name CMP-3-deoxy-D-manno-oct-2-ulosonate:lipid IVA 3-deoxy-D-manno-oct-2-ulosonate transferase. This enzyme catalyses the following chemical reaction

 lipid IVA + CMP-alpha-Kdo  alpha-Kdo-(2->6)-lipid IVA + CMP

The bifunctional enzyme from Escherichia coli transfers two 3-deoxy-D-manno-oct-2-ulosonate residues to lipid IVA.

See also 
EC 2.4.99.13, (KDO)-lipid IVA 3-deoxy-D-manno-octulosonic acid transferase

References

External links 

EC 2.4.99